The 1951–52 Duke Blue Devils men's basketball team represented Duke University during the 1951–52 men's college basketball season. The head coach was Harold Bradley, coaching his second season with the Blue Devils. The team finished with an overall record of 24–6.

Rankings

References 

Duke Blue Devils men's basketball seasons
Duke
1951 in sports in North Carolina
1952 in sports in North Carolina